Goltzius and the Pelican Company is a 2012 historical film by writer-director Peter Greenaway.

Plot
The film is based on the life of Hendrik Goltzius, a late 16th-century Dutch printer and engraver of erotic prints. He seduces the Margrave of Alsace into paying for a printing press to make and publish illustrated books. Goltzius promises him an extraordinary book of pictures of the Old Testament Biblical stories. Erotic tales of the temptation of Adam and Eve, Lot and his daughters, David and Bathsheba, Joseph and Potiphar's wife, Samson and Delilah, and John the Baptist and Salome. To tempt the Margrave further, Goltzius and his printing company will offer to perform dramatizations of these erotic stories for his court.

Goltzius and the Pelican Company is the second feature in Greenaway's film series "Dutch Masters", which includes the previous film Nightwatching.  The third entry in the series was to focus on Hieronymus Bosch and its release was planned to coincide with the 500th anniversary of Bosch's death in 2016.

Cast

 Ramsey Nasr as Hendrick Goltzius
 F. Murray Abraham as The Margrave of Alsace
 Goran Bogdan as Gottlieb
 Truus de Boer as Sophie
 Nada Abrus as Marie
 Duško Valentić as Priest
 Milan Pleština as Priest 3
 Enes Vejzović as Churchman 1
 Vedran Živolić as Joachim
 Katija Zubčić as Beatrice Fereres
 Boris Bakal as Messenger
 Vedran Komerički as Churchman
 Samir Vujčić as Priest 2
 Tvrtko Jurić as Priest 4

 The Pelican Company
 Giulio Berruti as Thomas Boethius
 Kate Moran as Adaela
  as Eduard Hansa
 Anne Louise Hassing as Susannah
 Hendrik Aerts as Strachey
 Halina Reijn as Portia
 Lars Eidinger as Quadfrey
 Pippo Delbono as Samuel van Gouda

 The Margrave's family and court
 Maaike Neuville as Isadora
  as Ebola Goyal
 Vincent Riotta as Ricardo del Monte
 Francesco De Vito as Rabbi Moab
  as Johannes Cleaver

Release
Goltzius and the Pelican Company was released on 17 September 2012.

Awards
 Peter Greenaway was nominated and won the FICE Award for Best European Director at the FICE- Federazione Italiana Cinema d’Essai in 2014.
 Peter Greenaway was nominated for the New Visions Award for Best Motion Picture at the Sitges - Catalan International Film Festival in 2013.

References

External links
 
 Teaser
 Synopsis
 Photos
 Netherlands Film Festival

Dutch independent films
English-language Croatian films
English-language Dutch films
English-language French films
Films based on biographies
Films directed by Peter Greenaway
2012 films
Biographical films about artists
Films set in France
Films set in the 16th century
French independent films
British independent films
Croatian independent films
Dutch biographical films
French biographical films
British biographical films
Croatian biographical films
Erotic drama films
2010s English-language films
2010s British films
2010s French films
2012 independent films